Rick Girdler (born May 23, 1955) is an American politician who has served in the Kentucky Senate from the 15th district since 2017.

References

1955 births
Living people
Republican Party Kentucky state senators
21st-century American politicians